Khasala may refer to:

 Khasala Khurd, lesser Khasala, village in Punjab, Pakistan
 Khasala Kalan, greater Khasala, village in Punjab, Pakistan